Roger Chaussabel (born 18 February 1932) is a former French racing cyclist. He finished in last place in the 1956 Tour de France.

References

External links
 

1932 births
Living people
French male cyclists
Cyclists from Marseille